A regent is a person selected to act as head of state (ruling or not) because the ruler is a minor, not present, or debilitated. Currently there is only one ruling Regency in the world, sovereign Liechtenstein. The following is a list of regents.

Regents in extant monarchies
Those who held a regency briefly, for example during surgery, are not necessarily listed, particularly if they performed no official acts; this list is also not complete, presumably not even for all monarchies included. The list includes some figures who acted as regent, even if they did not themselves hold the title of regent.

Asia

Cambodia
 Prince Sisowath Monireth, Chairman of the Regency Council of Cambodia in 1960
 Chea Sim, Acting Head of State of Cambodia from 1993 to 1994, and again from 1994 to 1995, and twice in 2004
 Nhek Bun Chhay, Acting Head of State of Cambodia in 2004

Japan

 Regent Empress Dowager Jingū for her son, the future Emperor Ōjin
 Prince Regent Shōtoku for his aunt, Empress Suiko
 Fujiwara Regents as Sesshō or Kampaku
 Prince Regent Hirohito for his father, Emperor Taishō, from 1921 to 1926.

Jordan
 Prince Naif bin Al-Abdullah from 20 July to 5 September 1951, due to the schizophrenia of his brother King Talal, who was in a Swiss mental hospital.
 A regency council (Ibrahim Hashem, Suleiman Toukan, Abdul Rahman Rusheidat and chairing Queen Mother Zein al-Sharaf Talal) took over during the king's ailment and continued after the king's forced abdication (on 11 August 1952), serving from 4 June 1952 to 2 May 1953, until King Hussein came of age.
 Crown Prince Hassan, from 4 July 1998 to 19 January 1999 while his brother King Hussein was undergoing cancer treatments.

Malaysia and its constitutive monarchies

Terengganu
 Tengku Muhammad Ismail (eight-years of age at the time), co-reigned with the three-member Regency Advisory Council (Majlis Penasihat Pemangku Raja) from 2006 to 2011. His father, Sultan Mizan Zainal Abidin the Sultan of Terengganu was elected as 13th King of Malaysia. The Malaysian constitution does not allow a simultaneous reign as both the King of Malaysia and as monarch of the King's native state (deemed absent on the State throne). Sultan Mizan was crowned as King on 13 December 2006 and the prince as the Regent (Pemangku Raja) of Terengganu effective on the same date.

Oman
 for the minor Sa`id (II) ibn Sultan (b. 1790 – succeeded 20 November 1804 –  d. 19 Oct 1856) : 20 November 1804 – 31 July 1806 Badr ibn Sayf (d. 1806)
 for Sultan Turki ibn Sa`id (b. 1832 – succeeded 30 January 1871 – died 4 Jun 1888) : August – December 1875 Abdul-Aziz ibn Said –  (b. 1850 – d. 1907)

Qatar
 H.E. Shaikh Abdullah bin Jassim Al Thani was proclaimed as regent when his father Sheikh Qasim bin Muhammad Al Thani became incapacitated, 13 May 1913; succeeded on his death, 17 July 1913

Saudi Arabia
 30 March 1964 – 2 November 1964 Crown Prince Faisal (b. 1906 – d. 1975)  –Regent for his brother King Saud, and later his successor
 1 January 1996 – 21 February 1996 formally, but de facto until 1 August 2005 Crown Prince Abdullah (b. 1924 – d. 2015) –Regent for his brother King Fahd, and later his successor

Thailand

 Prayurawongse for King Mongkut (1851–1855)
 Sri Suriwongse for King Chulalongkorn (1868–1873)
 Queen Saovabha Phongsri for King Chulalongkorn (1897)
 Crown Prince Maha Vajiravudh for King Chulalongkorn (1907)
 Prince Prajadhipok Sakdidej for King Vajiravudh (1925)
 Prince Paribatra Sukhumbandhu for King Prajadhipok (1932)
 Prince Narisara Nuwattiwong for King Prajadhipok (1934–1935)
 Prince Oscar Anuvatana (d. 1935), Prince Aditya Dibabha (1935–1944), Pan Sukhum (1935–1938), General Um Indrayodhin (1935–1942) and Pridi Banomyong (1941–1945) for King Ananda Mahidol
 Prem Tinsulanonda, regent from 13 October to 1 December 2016 while King Vajiralongkorn was in mourning for his father and predecessor.

Africa

Morocco
 The Wattasid Vizier Abu Zakariya Yahya was regent during the minority of the Marinid sultan Abd al-Haqq II; the Wattasid Viziers however kept the power beyond the majority of Abd al-Haqq II, until 1459 when most members of their family were killed by the sultan, allowing him to return to power.

Lesotho
 Queen Mamohato was regent for the exiled King Moshoeshoe II in 1970 and again in 1990, and after his death in 1996.

Swaziland
 Tibati Nkambule of Swaziland was regent following the death of Mbandzeni, until the majority of his son Ngwane V (1889 to 1894)
 Labotsibeni Mdluli was regent following the death of her son Ngwane V, until the majority of his son King Sobhuza II (1899 to 1921)
 Queen Dzeliwe was regent after the death of her husband King Sobhuza II from 1982 to 1983
 Prince Sozisa Dlamini was regent in 1983, following the death of King Sobhuza II and the regency of Queen Dzeliwe
 Queen Ntfombi was regent following the death of her husband King Sobhuza II, until the majority of his son King Mswati III (1983 to 1986)

Europe

Belgium
 Baron Erasme Louis Surlet de Chokier, Regent of Belgium until Leopold I's formal accession in 1831
 Prince Charles, Count of Flanders, prince regent of Belgium during his elder brother Leopold III's exile from 1944 to 1950
 Prince Baudouin, Duke of Brabant, prince regent of Belgium from 1950 to 1951

Denmark
 Christopher of Bavaria, regent of the realm prior to his official election as king, 1439-1440
 Johann Friedrich Struensee, de facto regent for King Christian VII, 1770–1772
 Hereditary Prince Frederick (along with, effectively, his mother, Queen Juliana Maria) for his half-brother (and her step-son), King Christian VII, 1772–1784
 Crown Prince Frederick for his father, King Christian VII, 1784–1808
 Crown Prince Frederick for his father, King Christian X, 1942–1943

Liechtenstein
 Prince Franz Joseph was regent for four months for his grand-uncle Sovereign Prince Franz I.
 Hereditary Prince Hans-Adam was regent for his father Sovereign Prince Franz Joseph II from 1984 until his death in 1989.
 Hereditary Prince Alois has been regent for his father Sovereign Prince Hans-Adam II since 15 August 2004.

Luxembourg
 Duke Adolph of Nassau was Regent from 8 April 1889 to 3 May 1889 and from 4 November 1890 to 23 November 1890, during the terminal illness of Grand Duke William III.
 Dowager Grand Duchess Marie Anne was Regent to her husband, Grand Duke William IV, during his terminal illness from 19 November 1908 to 25 February 1912, and then Regent to her daughter, Grand Duchess Marie-Adélaïde, during her minority from 25 February 1912 to 18 June 1912.
 Hereditary Grand Duke Jean was Regent for his mother, Grand Duchess Charlotte, from 4 May 1961 to 12 November 1964.
 Hereditary Grand Duke Henri was Regent for his father, Grand Duke Jean, from 4 March 1998 to 7 October 2000.

Monaco
 Hereditary Prince Albert was regent from his father Prince Rainier III from 31 March 2005 to 6 April 2005, when he succeeded him as Prince Albert II

Netherlands
 Dowager Princess Anne, during the minority of her son, William V, Prince of Orange, between 1751 and 1759
 Dowager Princess Marie Louise, during the minority of her son, William IV, Prince of Orange from 1711 to 1730, and the minority of her grandson, William V, jointly with Duke Louis Ernest of Brunswick-Lüneburg from 1759 till her death in 1765.
 Duke Louis Ernest of Brunswick-Lüneburg, the Captain-General of the Dutch army, during the minority of William V, jointly with Dowager Princess Marie Louise from 1759 until her death in 1765, and with Princess Carolina of Orange-Nassau (1765-1766)
 Princess Carolina, during the minority of her brother, William V, and jointly with Duke Louis Ernest, between 1765 and 1766.
 Council of State, during insanity of the King William III in 1889 and again in 1890
 Dowager Queen Emma (1890–1898), during the minority of her daughter Queen Wilhelmina, between 1890 and 1898
 Princess Juliana during illness of her mother Queen Wilhelmina in 1947 and again in 1948

Norway
 King Magnus Eriksson (1343–1355) after stepping down from the throne in favor of his son Haakon Magnusson
Johann Friedrich Struensee, de facto regent for King Christian VII, 1770–1772
 Hereditary Prince Frederick (along with, effectively, his mother, Queen Juliana Maria) for his half-brother (and her step-son), King Christian VII, 1772–1784
 Crown Prince Frederick for his father, King Christian VII, 1784–1808
 Crown Prince Olav was regent for his father King Haakon VII in 1945, awaiting his return at end of the Second World War, and during his illness between 1955 and 1957.
 Crown Prince Harald was regent during the illness of his father King Olav V between 1990 and 1991.
 Crown Prince Haakon was regent from 25 November 2003 to 12 April 2004 and from 29 March to 7 June 2005 during the illness of his father King Harald V.

Spain

 Crown of Castile: Ferdinand II of Aragon, twice regent of Castile (1504–1506, 1507–1516) for Queen Juana
 Pope Adrian VI (1520–1522) and Isabella of Portugal (1529–1533, 1535–1536, 1538–1539) and Prince Philip (1539–1541, 1543–1548, 1551–1554) and Archduke Maximilian (1548–1551) and Maria of Austria (1548–1551) during Charles I's absences.
 Joan of Austria, Princess Dowager of Portugal (Infanta Juana), regent of Castile (1554–1559) for King Philip II of Spain during the king's marriage to Queen Mary I of England.
 Fernando de Acevedo as President of the Council of Castile during King Philip III's visit to Portugal in 1619.
 Queen Mariana of Austria, regent of Spain during the minority of her son Charles II from 1665 to 1675.
 Luis Manuel Fernández de Portocarrero cardinal and archbishop of Toledo during King Charles II's illness in 1700.
 Government Board of the Realms during the illness of Charles II and Philip V absence from 1700 to 1701.
 Luis Manuel Fernández de Portocarrero cardinal and archbishop of Toledo during King Philip V's absence from 1701 to 1703.
 Queen Regent Elisabeth Farnese during King Charles III's absence in 1759.
 Infante Antonio Pascual of Spain, French invasion (King Ferdinand VII's absence) in 1808.
 Lieutenant General Joachim Murat (1808) and Jean de Dieu Soult (1813) during King Joseph's absence.
 A Supreme Central and Governmental Junta of Spain and the Indies from 25 September 1808 to 31 January 1810 and a Regency Council (the Cortes of Cádiz from 1 February 1810 to 10 May 1814 during the imprisonment/abdication of Ferdinand VII.
 Regencies during the Hundred Thousand Sons of St. Louis Intervention (1823): Provisional Regency Council of the Realm. President: Cayetano Valdés y Flores, Provisional Government Board of Spain and the Indies. President: Francisco de Eguía, Regency Council of the Realm during King's Captivity. President: Pedro de Alcántara Álvarez de Toledo, 13th Duke of the Infantado.
  Queen Maria Christina of the Two Sicilies during the minority of her daughter Isabella II from 1833 to 1840.
 Baldomero Espartero, Prince of Vergara during the minority of Isabella II from 1840 to 1843.
 Francisco Serrano, duke of la Torre, during the interregnum between the reigns of Isabella II and Amadeo I, from 1868 to 1871.
 Antonio Cánovas del Castillo during King Alfonso XII's absence from 1874 to 1875.
Queen Maria Christina of Austria, regent during her pregnancy after her husband's death and then for her son Alfonso XIII from 26 November 1885 – 17 May 1902.
 The Caudillo general Francisco Franco, became de facto regent for life in 1947 to 1975, after reinstating the monarchy with a vacant royal throne ultimately filled by Juan Carlos.

Sweden
 Mats Kettilmundsson (1318–1319), between the deposition of the king Birger Magnusson and the election of three-year-old Magnus Eriksson asking.
 Ingeborg of Norway (1319–1326) president of the council of regents for her underage son, the king Magnus Eriksson, in both Sweden and Norway.
 Karl Knutsson (Bonde) (1438–1440), during the interregnum following the deposition of the king Eric XIII; later became king as Charles VIII
 Bengt Jönsson Oxenstierna (1448; together with his brother Nils Jönsson Oxenstierna), during the interregnum between the death of Christopher of Bavaria and the election of Karl Knutsson (Bonde) as king.
 Nils Jönsson Oxenstierna (1448; together with his brother Bengt Jönsson Oxenstierna), during the interregnum between the death of Christopher of Bavaria and the election of Karl Knutsson (Bonde) as king.
 Jöns Bengtsson Oxenstierna (1457; together with Erik Axelsson Tott), during the interregnum following the first deposition of King Charles VIII, and again (1465–1466), following his second deposition.
 Kettil Karlsson Vasa (1464), during the interregnum following the first deposition of King Christian I; and again (1465), following the second deposition of Charles VIII
 Erik Axelsson Tott (1457; together with Jöns Bengtsson Oxenstierna) (1466–1467), following the end of Jöns Oxenstierna's second regency.
 Sten Sture the Elder (1470–1497, 1501–1503) the longest-serving regent during the Kalmar Union
 Svante Nilsson (1503–1512), succeeding Sten Sture the Elder.
 Erik Trolle 1512.
 Sten Sture the Younger (1512–1520), succeeding Svante Sture.
 Gustav Eriksson Vasa was firstly Regent (1521–1523) after the final dissolution of Kalmar Union, but soon was proclaimed King.
 Duke Charles of Södermanland (1599–1604) after ousting his Catholic nephew King Sigismund, until he himself claimed the throne.
 Axel Oxenstierna (1632–1644), during the minority of Queen Christina.
 Dowager Queen Hedwig Eleonora of Holstein-Gottorp (1660–1672), during the minority of her son King Charles XI, again (1697–1699), during the minority of her grandson King Charles XII, and finally, de facto, during Charles's absence from Sweden during the early years of the Great Northern War (1700–1713).
 Princess Ulrika Eleonora, during the frequent absences of her brother, Charles XII, in the later years of the Great Northern War (1713–1718)
 Charles, Duke of Södermanland (1792–1796) for his underage nephew Gustav IV Adolf of Sweden, and again (1809) after Gustav IV Adolf was deposed and before Charles himself was proclaimed King Charles XIII.
 Crown Prince Charles John (1810–1818), for his adoptive father King Charles XIII, due to Charles XIII's incapacity.
 Crown Prince Charles (1857–1859), for his father King Oscar I, due to Oscar's incapacity.

United Kingdom and its predecessor realms

 George, Prince Regent (1811–1820), during the incapacity of his father, George III.

Kingdom of Great Britain
 After the death of Queen Anne in 1714 a regency under Lord Parker, the Lord Chief Justice, was set up while King George I was sent for to take up the crown.
 George, Prince of Wales (1716–17), during the absence of his father, George I.
Queen Caroline of Ansbach (1729; 1732; 1735; 1736–37), during the absences of her husband, George II.

Kingdom of England
 Ælfthryth (978–984), during the minority of her son King Æthelred the Unready.
 William Longchamp (intermittently 1189–1197), during the absences of Richard I on the Third Crusade, imprisoned in the Holy Roman Empire, and in France.
 William Marshal, 1st Earl of Pembroke (1216–1219) and then Hubert de Burgh, 1st Earl of Kent (1219–1227), during the minority of King Henry III  
 A regency council headed by Henry, 3rd Earl of Lancaster (1327–1330) during the minority of Edward III
 John, Duke of Bedford (1422–1435), Humphrey, Duke of Gloucester and Henry Beaufort (1422–1437), during the minority of their nephew, Henry VI
 Richard Plantagenet, 3rd Duke of York (1454–1455; 1455–1456), during the incapacity of his cousin, Henry VI
 Richard, Duke of Gloucester (1483), during the minority of his nephew, Edward V
 Lady Margaret Beaufort (1509) during the minority of her grandson Henry VIII
 Queen Catherine of Aragon (1513) while Henry VIII was in France. In this time she played a large role in the defeat of the Scots at the Battle of Flodden, and was Queen Regent for several months.
 Queen Catherine Parr (1544), while Henry VIII was in France.
 Edward Seymour, 1st Duke of Somerset (1547–1549), during the minority of his nephew, Edward VI
 John Dudley, 1st Duke of Northumberland (1550–1553), during the minority of Edward VI
 During the month of March 1617, Francis Bacon served as regent of England during the reign of King James I of England
 William III personally led his army into battle each year during the Nine Years' War (1689–1698).  In his absence, the kingdom was administered by his wife and co-ruler Queen Mary II until her death in 1694, and thereafter by a council of seven Lord Justices (sometimes referred to as the "Lords Regent"): William Cavendish, 1st Duke of Devonshire (1640–1707), Charles Sackville, 6th Earl of Dorset (1638–1706), Sidney Godolphin, 1st Earl of Godolphin (1645–1712), Thomas Herbert, 8th Earl of Pembroke (1656–1733), Charles Talbot, 1st Duke of Shrewsbury (1660–1718), John Somers, Baron Somers (1651–1716), and Thomas Tenison, Archbishop of Canterbury.

Kingdom of Scotland
 A regency council of six Guardians existed (1286–1290) during the minority of Margaret, Maid of Norway. These were; William Fraser, Bishop of St Andrews; Donnchadh III, Earl of Fife (followed by Donnchadh IV, Earl of Fife); Alexander Comyn, Earl of Buchan; Robert Wishart, Bishop of Glasgow; James Stewart, 5th High Steward of Scotland; and John Comyn II of Badenoch
 William Wallace (1298), claiming to act as regent on behalf of the deposed King John
 Robert the Bruce, Earl of Carrick (1298–1300)
 John Comyn III of Badenoch (1298–1301; 1302–1304)
 William Lamberton, Bishop of St Andrews (1299–1301)
 Sir Ingram de Umfraville (1300–1301)
 John de Soules (1301–1304)
 Thomas Randolph, 1st Earl of Moray (1329–1332) (during the minority of David II)
 Donald, Earl of Mar (1332) (during the minority of David II)
 Sir Andrew Murray (1332) (during the minority of David II)
 Sir Archibald Douglas (1332–1333) (during the minority of David II)
 Robert Stewart, 7th High Steward of Scotland (1334–1335) (during the minority of his half-uncle David II)
 John Randolph, 3rd Earl of Moray (1334–1335) (during the minority of David II)
 Sir Andrew Murray (1335–1338) (during the minority of David II)
 Robert Stewart, 7th High Steward of Scotland (1338–1341; 1346–1357) (during the minority and later captivity of his half-uncle David II)
 John Stewart, Earl of Carrick (1384–1388) (during the incapacity of his father, Robert II)
 Robert Stewart, 1st Earl of Fife (1388–1393) (during the incapacity of his father, Robert II and of his brother, Robert III)
 David Stewart, 1st Duke of Rothesay (1399–1401) (during the incapacity of his father, Robert III)
 Robert Stewart, 1st Duke of Albany (1401–1420) (during the incapacity of his brother Robert III, and then during the minority and captivity of his nephew James I)
 Murdoch Stewart, 2nd Duke of Albany (1420–1424) (during the captivity of his cousin James I)
 Archibald Douglas, 5th Earl of Douglas (1437–1439) (during the minority of James II)
 William Crichton, 1st Lord Crichton and Sir Alexander Livingston (1439–1445) (during the minority of James II)
 William Douglas, 8th Earl of Douglas (1445–1449) (during the minority of James II)
  Queen Mary of Gueldres (1460–1463) (during the minority of her son, James III)
 James Kennedy and Gilbert Kennedy, 1st Lord Kennedy (1463–1466) (during the minority of James III)
 Robert Boyd, 1st Lord Boyd (1466–1469) (during the minority of James III)
 Patrick Hepburn (1488–1494) (during the minority of James IV)
  Queen Margaret Tudor (1513–1514) (during the minority of her son, James V)
 John Stewart, 2nd Duke of Albany (1514–1524) (during the minority of his cousin James V)
 Archibald Douglas, 6th Earl of Angus and Archbishop James Beaton (1524–1528) (during the minority of the former's stepson James V)
 James Hamilton, 2nd Earl of Arran (1542–1554) (during the minority of his cousin, Mary, Queen of Scots)
  QueenMary of Guise (1554–1560) (during the minority of her daughter Mary, Queen of Scots)
 James Stuart, 1st Earl of Moray (1567–1570) (during the minority of his nephew James VI)
 Matthew Stewart, 4th Earl of Lennox (1570–1571) (during the minority of his grandson James VI)
 John Erskine, Earl of Mar (1571–1572) (during the minority of James VI)
 James Douglas, 4th Earl of Morton (1572–1581) (during the minority of James VI)

Regents in defunct monarchies 
The same notes apply; inclusion in this list reflects the political reality, regardless of claims to the throne.

Asia

China

 Duke of Zhou, during the minority of his nephew Song Ji, the King Cheng of Zhou until he was old enough to rule.
 Empress Lü
 Huo Guang, during the reign of Emperor Xuan of Han, the emperor reaffirmed that all important matters were to be presented to Huo before Huo would present them to the emperor. The source of title of highest imperial nobility of ancient Japan "Kanpaku" (Regent).
 Dong Zhuo, Cao Cao, Cao Pi during the reign of Emperor Xian of Han.
 Cao Zhen, Cao Xiu, Chen Qun, Sima Yi during the reign of Emperor Cao Rui.
 Cao Shuang, Sima Yi and Sima Shi during the reign of Emperor Cao Fang.
 Sima Zhao and Sima Yan during the reign of Emperor Cao Mao and Emperor Cao Huan.
 Zhuge Liang, Jiang Wan, Fei Yi during the reign of the Emperor Liu Shan.
 Zhuge Ke, Sun Jun and Sun Chen during the reign of Emperor Sun Liang.
 Empress Dowager Feng
 Wu Zetian
 Xiao Yanyan
 Empress Liu
 Empress Gao
 Yang Shiqi, Yang Rong, Yang Pu, Zhang Fu and Hu Ying during the minority of the Zhengtong Emperor from 1435 to 1442.
 Gao Gong, Zhang Juzheng, Gao Yi and Feng Bao during the minority of the Wanli Emperor from 1572 to 1582.
 Dorgon, Jierhalang and Duoduo as Prince-Regent, from 1643 to 1650 during the minority of his nephew Fulin, the Shunzhi Emperor.
 Sonin, Suksaha, Ebilun and Oboi during the minority of the Kangxi Emperor from 1661 to their various deaths or downfalls. The last one, Oboi fell from grace in 1669.
 Zaiyuan, Duanhua, Sushun, Jingshou, Muyin, Kuangyuan, Du Han and Jiao Youying during the minority of the Tongzhi Emperor in 1861.
 Empress Dowager Ci'an (1861–1873, 1875–1881), Empress Dowager Cixi (1861–1873, 1875–1889, 1898–1908) and Yixin (1861–1865) during the minority of the Tongzhi Emperor and de facto ruler for almost the entire reign of the Guangxu Emperor.
 Zaifeng, between 1908 and 1911 for his son Puyi, Empress Dowager Longyu (1908–1912) abdicated monarchy on behalf of Puyi in 1912.

Afghanistan
Before the 1881 unification, there were essentially four rulers' capitals: Kabul, Herat, Qandahar and Peshawar (the last now in Pakistan); all their rulers belonged to the Abdali tribal group, whose name was changed to Dorrani with Ahmad Shah Abdali. They belong either to the Saddozay segment of the Popalzay clan (typically styled padshah, king) or to the Mohammadzay segment of the Barakzay clan (typically with the style Amir, in full Amir al-Mo´menin "Leader of the Faithful"). The Mohammadzay also furnished the Saddozay kings frequently with top counselors, who served occasionally as (Minister-)regents, identified with the epithet Mohammadzay.

South Asia

Ahom Kingdom
 Queen Phuleshwari (1722-1732) of Ahom kingdom
 Queen Ambika (1732-1739) of Ahom kingdom
 Queen Sarbeswari (1739-1744) of Ahom kingdom

Madurai
 Rani Mangammal (1684–1703) 
of Madurai Nayak dynasty

Mughal Empire
 Bairam Khan (1556–1560) during the minority of Akbar

Vijayanagara Empire
Tuluva Narasa Nayaka for Thimma Bhupala (1491) and Narasimha Raya II. (1491-1505) Following Narasimha II's assassination, Narasa's son, Viranarasimha Raya, would be crowned emperor.
Aliya Rama Raya for Sadasiva Raya. (1542 to 1556)

Qutub Shahi dynasty 
Saif Khan for Subhan Quli Qutb Shah. (1550)

Travancore
Both before and during the British raj (colonial rule), most of India was ruled by several hundred native princely houses, many of which have known regencies, under the raj subject to British approval
 Maharani Gowri Lakshmi Bayi of Travancore (1811–1815)
 Maharani Gowri Parvati Bayi (1815–1849)
 Maharani Sethu Lakshmi Bayi (1924–1931)

Vakataka Kingdom 
 Prabhavati (ca. 390–410)

Iran
 Prince Nasir al-Mulk (1910–1914), during the minority of King Ahmad Shah Qajar.

Iraq
In the short-lived Hashemite kingdom, there were three regencies in the reign of the third and last king Faysal II (b. 1935 – d. 1958; also Head of the 'Arab Union', a federation with the Hashemite sister-kingdom Jordan, from 14 February 1958) :
 4 April 1939 – 1 April 1941 Prince 'Abd al-Ilah (1st time) (b. 1913 – d. 1958)
 1 April 1941 – 1 June 1941 Sharaf ibn Rajih al-Fawwaz (b. 1880 – d. 1955)
 1 June 1941 –  2 May 1953 Crown Prince 'Abd al-Ilah (2nd time)

Korea
 Daewon-gun, Lord Regent for his son King Gojong of Joseon during the late 19th century.

Mongolia 
 Tolui, the son of Genghis Khan of the Mongol Empire
 Töregene, the Great Khatun of the Mongol Empire
 Oghul Qaimish, the wife of Güyük Khan

Myanmar
 Naratheinga Uzana:  (1230/31–1235), during the reign of King Htilominlo
 Athinkhaya:  (1297–1310), co-regent with his two brothers during the reign of puppet King Saw Hnit
 Yazathingyan: (1297–1312/13), co-regent
 Thihathu: (1297–1313), co-regent, unilaterally declared himself king in 1309
 Sithu of Pinya:  (1340–1344), after the abdication of King Uzana I of Pinya
 Maha Dewi:  (1383–1384), Princess-Regent during the last weeks of her brother King Binnya U

Nepal
 Prince Gyanendra was regent following the murder of his brother King Birendra, during the four-day coma of Birenda's son King Dipendra upon whose death he succeeded as King

Tibetan Empire
 Khri ma lod for her son Tridu Songtsen (675–689) and again for her grandson Me Agtsom (704–712)

Turkey 

 Yariri for the later king Kamani in the Neo-Hittite state of Carchemish located at the present-day border of Turkey and Syria (early to mid 8th century BC).
 Kösem Sultan, Naib-i-Sultanat (regent) of the Ottoman Empire during the minority of her son Murad IV (10 September 1623 – 1632) and her grandson Mehmed IV (8 August 1648 – 2 September 1651)
 Turhan Hatice Sultan, Naib-i-Sultanat (regent) of the Ottoman Empire during the minority of her son Mehmed IV (3 September 1651 – 1656)

Vietnam
 Queen Jiu during the reign of her son King Zhao Xing.
 Lê Hoàn and Empress Dowager Dương Vân Nga during the short reign of her son Emperor Đinh Phế Đế (lit. Deposed Emperor Dinh), after her husband Emperor Đinh Tiên Hoàng was assassinated.
 Empress Mother Linh Nhân, while her husband Emperor Lý Thánh Tông led a military campaign against the kingdom of Champa (1st time) and again, during the reign of her son Emperor Lý Nhân Tông (2nd time).
 Empress Mother Linh Chiếu (1138–1158) for her son Emperor Lý Anh Tông.
 Trần Thừa and Trần Thủ Độ during the reign of Emperor Trần Thái Tông. Trần Thừa also called Retired Emperor Trần Thái Tổ, is Emperor Trần Thái Tông's father. He was the only "Emperor" who did not held the throne of the Trần dynasty. Grand Chancellor Trần Thủ Độ is Trần Thái Tông's uncle.
 Hồ Quý Ly, during the reign of Trần dynasty's emperors ─ Trần Thuận Tông & Trần Thiếu Đế; and later, the reign of his son ─ Emperor Hồ Hán Thương of Hồ dynasty.
 Empress Mother Tuyên Từ (1443–1453), during the reign of her son Emperor Lê Nhân Tông.
 Consort Tuyên ─ Đặng Thị Huệ (Consort of Lord Trịnh Sâm) during the reign of her son, Lord Trịnh Cán.

Africa

Egypt

 Queen Neithhotep for either Hor-Aha or Djer (c. 3000 B.C.)
 Queen Merneith for Den of Egypt (c. 2950 B.C.)
 Queen Nimaathap for Djoser (c. 2686 B.C.)
 Queen Khentkaus I for an unknown pharaoh
 Queen Khentkaus II for Nyuserre Ini
 Queen Iput I for Pepi I (c. 2332 B.C.)
 Queen Ankhesenpepi II for Pepi II (c. 2278 B.C.)
 Queen Ahhotep I for Ahmose I (c. 1550 B.C.)
 Queen Ahmose-Nefertari for Amenhotep I (c. 1526 B.C.)
 Queen Hatshepsut for Thutmose III of Egypt during the early part of his reign before she became co-ruling Pharaoh in her own right (c. 1479-1472 B.C.)
 Queen Mutemwiya for Amenhotep III (c. 1388 B.C.)
 General Horemheb for Tutankhamun (c. 1332-1323 B.C.)
 Queen Twosret for Siptah (c. 1197-1191 B.C.)
 Prince Tjahapimu for Djedhor during his military campaigns against the Achaemenid Empire (c. 360 B.C.)
 Minister Agathocles for Ptolemy V (c. 204-202 B.C.)
 Governor Tlepolemus for Ptolemy V (c. 202-201 B.C.)
 Minister Aristomenes for Ptolemy V (c. 201-196 B.C.)
 Queen Cleopatra I for Ptolemy VI (c. 180-176 B.C.)
 Eulaeus and Lenaeus for Ptolemy VI (c. 176-170 B.C.)
 Pothinus for Cleopatra VII and Ptolemy XIII (c. 51-48 B.C.)
 Commander Abu al-Misk Kafur for Abu'l-Qasim Unujur ibn al-Ikhshid and Abu'l-Hasan Ali ibn al-Ikhshid (946-966 A.D.)
 Vizier Ja'far ibn al-Furat for Abu'l-Fawaris Ahmad ibn Ali (968 and 969)
 Prince Al-Hasan ibn Ubayd Allah ibn Tughj for Abu'l-Fawaris Ahmad ibn Ali (968-969)
 Wasita Barjawan for Al-Hakim bi-Amr Allah (996-1000)
 Princess Sitt al-Mulk for Al-Zahir li-i'zaz Din Allah (1021-1023)
 Vizier Ali ibn Ahmad al-Jarjara'i for Al-Mustansir Billah (1036-1045)
 Caliph Mother Rasad for Al-Mustansir Billah (1045-1062)
 Prince Al-Hafiz for At-Tayyib Abu'l-Qasim (1130)
 Vizier Kutayfat for At-Tayyib Abu'l-Qasim (1130-1131)
 Vizier Tala'i ibn Ruzzik for Al-Fa'iz bi-Nasr Allah and Al-Adid (1154-1161)
 Sultana Shajar al-Durr following the death of her husband As-Salih Ayyub (1249-1250)
 Atabak Aybak for Al-Ashraf Musa (1250-1254)
 Emir Qalawun for Solamish (1279)
 Emir Al-Adil Kitbugha for Al-Nasir Muhammad (1293-1294)
 Emir Baibars al-Jashankir for Al-Nasir Muhammad (1299-1304)
 Viceroy Sayf al-Din Salar for Al-Nasir Muhammad (1299-1304)
 Emir Qawsun for Al-Ashraf Kujuk (1341-1342)
 Emir Yalbugha al-Umari for Al-Mansur Muhammad and Al-Ashraf Sha'ban (1361-1366)
 Emir Barquq for Al-Mansur Ali II and As-Salih Hajji (1377-1382)
 Prince Mohammed Ali Tewfik, Aziz Ezzat Pasha, Sherif Sabri Pasha for King Farouk I of Egypt (1936–1937)
 Prince Muhammad Abdul Moneim, Bahey El Din Barakat Pasha, Rashad Mehanna for King Fuad II of Egypt (1952–1953)

Ethiopia
 Eleni of Ethiopia served as regent between 1507 and 1516 during the minority of Emperor Dawit II.
 Mentewab for her son Iyasu II
 Ras Tessema Nadew in 1913 during the minority of Iyasu who would have been crowned as Iyasu V
 Tafari Makonnen from 1916 to 1931 during the reign of a female, Empress Zewditu (Queen of Kings, Nigiste Negestatt). Upon her death, the regent himself ascended the throne and was crowned as Emperor Haile Selassie I (King of Kings, Negusa Nagast)

Americas

Brazil

 John, Prince Regent, was responsible for elevating Brazil to the status of Kingdom in 1815. One year later, he was acclaimed King of Portugal, Brazil and Algarves.
 Pedro, Prince Regent, was responsible for declaring the independence of Brazil, in 1822, during his regency (1820–1822), after his father, John VI, returned to Portugal. Some months later, he would be acclaimed Emperor of Brazil.
 Maria Leopoldina, Empress consort of Brazil, acted as Empress Regent while her husband, Pedro I, was away – especially during the war against Uruguay.
 Provisional Triumviral Regency – from 7 April to 18 June 1831, comprised José Joaquim Carneiro de Campos, Marquess of Caravelas, Nicolau Pereira de Campos Vergueiro and Francisco de Lima e Silva, was formed to rule the country after the abdication of Pedro I.
 Permanent Triumviral Regency – from 18 June 1831 to 12 October 1835, comprised Francisco de Lima e Silva as well as José da Costa Carvalho and João Bráulio Muniz.
 Diogo Antônio Feijó – from 12 October 1835 to 19 September 1837, during what was considered the advance of the Liberal Party
 Pedro de Araújo Lima, Marquis of Olinda – from 1837 (provisional to 1838) to 1840, during what was considered the retaken of the Conservative Party.
 Isabel, Princess Imperial of Brazil, was Princess Regent of the Empire of Brazil three times (1871–1872; 1876–1877; 1887–1888) while her father travelled abroad. During her last regency, she signed the abolition of slavery in Brazil (known as the "Lei Áurea", or "Golden Law"), on 13 May 1888, whereby Isabel got the sobriquet Isabel the Redeemer. For the act of signing the Golden Law, she was awarded the Golden Rose by Pope Leo XIII.

Europe

Austria
For most of the reign of the epileptic and severely disabled Emperor Ferdinand I (1835–1848), Ferdinand's uncle, Archduke Ludwig (from 1836 to 1848), acted as a de facto regent.

Bulgaria

 Stefan Stambolov, during the absence of Prince Alexander Battenberg from the Bulgarian throne between 28 August 1886 and 3 September 1886 and the vacancy of the throne between 7 September 1886 and 14 August 1887.
 Kiril, Prince of Preslav and Bogdan Filov and Nikola Mikhov together as Regency Council, during the minority of the former's nephew Simeon II (1943–1944).
 Venelin Ganev and Todor Pavlov and Tsvetko Boboshevski together as Regency Council, during the minority of Simeon II (1944–1946)

Finland
After the abdication of Nicholas II of Russia, the throne of the Grand Duke of Finland was vacant and according to the constitution of 1772, a regent was installed by the Finnish Parliament during the first two years of Finnish independence, before the country was declared a republic.
 Pehr Evind Svinhufvud, installed in January 1918, resigned in late 1918.
 Baron Carl Gustaf Emil Mannerheim, resigned 1919 with the passing of the new constitution.

France
 Anne of Kiev and Baldwin V, Count of Flanders (1060–1066), during the minority of her son and his nephew Philip I
 Suger, Abbot of St. Denis (1147–1149), during the absence of Louis VII on the Second Crusade
 Adèle of Champagne and Guillaume de Champagne, Archbishop of Reims (1190–1191), during the absence of her son Philip II on the Third Crusade.
 Blanche of Castile (1226–1234), during the minority of her son Louis IX
 Blanche of Castile (1248–1252) and Alphonse, Count of Poitou and Toulouse (1248–1254), during the absence of her son and his brother Louis IX on the Seventh Crusade.
 Mathieu de Vendôme, Abbot of Saint-Denis and Simon de Clermont, Sieur de Nesle, during the absence of Louis IX on the Eighth Crusade (1270).
 Philip the Tall (1316), during the interregnum between the death of his brother Louis X and the birth of Louis' posthumous son John I, and during the minority of the short-lived John I.
 Philip, Count of Valois and Anjou (1328), from the death of his cousin Charles IV until the birth of a posthumous daughter to the late king brought about Valois' own accession to the throne.
 Joan the Lame (1340) during absence of her husband Philip VI. 
 Joan the Lame (1345–1346) during absence of her husband Philip VI. 
 Joan the Lame (1347) during absence of her husband Philip VI. 
 Charles, the Dauphin (1356–1360), during the captivity of his father in England
 Louis I, Duke of Anjou (1380–1382), during the minority of his nephew Charles VI
 Jean, Duke of Berry, Philippe II, Duke of Burgundy, and Louis II, Duke of Bourbon (1382–1388), during the minority of their nephew, Charles VI
 Louis II, Duke of Bourbon and John, Duke of Berry (1392–1407), during the insanity of their nephew, Charles VI
 Isabella of Bavaria (1417–1420) and then Henry V of England, during the insanity of her husband and his father-in-law, Charles VI; they were opposed by
 Charles, the Dauphin (1417–1422), Charles VI's eldest surviving son, who also claimed the regency.
 John, Duke of Bedford (1422–1435), acting as regent on behalf of his nephew, the young Henry VI of England in opposition to the king Charles VII
 Charlotte of Savoy (1465) during the absence of her husband Louis XI 
 Anne of France and her husband Pierre de Beaujeu (1483–1491), during the minority of her brother, Charles VIII
 Louise of Savoy (1515–1516), during the absence of her son, Francis I, in Italy.
 Louise of Savoy (1523–1526), during the absence at war in Italy, and then the captivity, of her son, Francis I
 Catherine de' Medici:
(1552) While her husband Henry II left the kingdom for the campaign of Metz.
(1560–1563) During the minority of her second son, Charles IX
(1574) During the absence of her third son, Henry III, in Poland
 Marie de' Medici (1610–1614), during the minority of her son, Louis XIII
 Anne of Austria (1643–1651), during the minority of her son Louis XIV
 Philippe II, Duke of Orléans (1715–1723), during the minority of Louis XV; often called "the Regent", since he was the last regent of France. **The related era and style are commonly referred to as the Régence (analogous to the British Regency period).
 A 136 carat (27.2 g) diamond he acquired in 1717 is known as 'le régent'
 Louis-Stanislas-Xavier, comte de Provence, while living in exile, self-declared Regent for his nephew Louis XVII of France after the 1793 guillotining of King Louis XVI, until the young pretender's death in 1795.
 Charles-Philippe de France, comte d'Artois, appointed Lieutenant General of the Kingdom by a temporary government from 14 April 1814 until Louis XVIII arrived from England.
 Empress Eugenie, three times for her husband, Napoleon III of France, during his absence.

Greece

 Josef Ludwig von Armansperg, Carl Wilhelm von Heideck, Georg Ludwig von Maurer, Egid von Kobell, Johann Baptist von Greiner (1833–1835): on behalf of the minor King Otto.
 Prince Johann of Schleswig-Holstein-Sonderburg-Glücksburg (1867): on behalf of George I while he was on a tour in Europe.
 Olga Constantinovna of Russia (1920): on behalf of the minor King Alexander.
 Pavlos Kountouriotis (1923–1924): on behalf of the minor King George II.
 Georgios Kondylis (1935): on behalf of the minor King George II.
 Archbishop Damaskinos Papandreou (1944–1946): on behalf of King George II until his return after World War II.
 Crown Prince Constantine (1964): on behalf of the ill King Paul.
 General Georgios Zoitakis (1967–1972): appointed by the military junta of the time when the last reigning king, Constantine II of Greece, fled to exile after a failed royal countercoup.
 Military dictator Colonel Georgios Papadopoulos (1972–1973): then Prime Minister, assumed the additional role of regent until the monarchy was abolished by the junta in 1973.

German Empire

Anhalt
 Prince Aribert (1918), during the minority of his nephew, Duke Joachim Ernst.

Baden
 Prince Frederick (1852–1856), during the incapacity of his brother, Grand Duke Louis II.

Bavaria
 Prince Luitpold (1886–1912), during the incapacity of his nephews, Ludwig II and Otto.
 Prince Ludwig (1912–1913), during the incapacity of his cousin, Otto.

Brunswick
 George, Prince of Wales, later King George IV of the United Kingdom (1815–1823), during the minority of his cousin, Duke Charles II.
 Prince Albrecht of Prussia (1885–1906), during the interregnum following the death of Duke Wilhelm in 1884, when the throne could not be filled due to the status of the heir, the Duke of Cumberland, as an enemy of the Reich.
 Duke Johann Albrecht of Mecklenburg-Schwerin (1907–1913), for the same reason.

Hanover
 George, Prince of Wales (1813–1820), due to the insanity of his father, King George III.

Hesse-Kassel
 Electoral Prince Frederick William (1831–1847), due to the incapacity of his father, Elector William II.

Lippe
 Prince Adolf of Schaumburg-Lippe (1895–1897), due to the incapacity of his cousin, Prince Alexander.
 Count Ernst of Lippe-Biesterfeld (1897–1904), for the same reason.
 Count Leopold of Lippe-Biesterfeld (1904–1905), for the same reason.

Mecklenburg-Schwerin
 Duke Johann Albrecht of Mecklenburg-Schwerin (1897–1901), due to the minority of his nephew, Grand Duke Friedrich Franz IV.

Mecklenburg-Strelitz
 Friedrich Franz IV, Grand Duke of Mecklenburg-Schwerin (1918), due to the near extinction of the Mecklenburg-Strelitz line.

Prussia
 Prince William (1858–1861), during the incapacity of his brother Frederick William IV.

Saxe-Coburg and Gotha
 Prince Ernst of Hohenlohe-Langenburg (1900–1905), during the minority of his cousin Duke Charles Edward.

Saxe-Meiningen
 Luise Eleonore of Hohenlohe (1803–1821), during the minority of her son, Duke Bernard II.

Saxe-Weimar
 Anna Amalia of Brunswick (1758–1775), during the minority of her son, Duke Carl August.

Saxony
 Duchess Maria Antonia of Bavaria (1763–1769), during the minority of her son, Elector Frederick Augustus III.

Waldeck
 Emma of Anhalt-Bernburg-Schaumburg-Hoym (1845–1852), during the minority of her son, Prince George Victor.

Hungary
 Helena and Beloš Vukanović, in 1141–1146 during the rule of infant Géza II. Helena was the mother and Beloš her brother.
 Andrew of Hungary, between 1204 and 1205 during the rule of the infant Ladislaus III
 Elizabeth of Bosnia, regent for her daughter Mary between 1382–1385 and in 1386. Had assassinated her daughter's opponent Charles II, but was murdered herself the following year.
 John Hunyadi, during Ladislaus V's minority
 Michael Szilágyi in 1458, between Ladislaus V's death and the crowning of Matthias I
 George Martinuzzi (1540–1551) and Isabella Jagiellon (1556–1559) for John II
 Lajos Kossuth, under the Hungarian Revolution of 1848
 Joseph August, briefly after the fall of the Hungarian Soviet Republic in 1919.  He is the last Habsburg to be a head of state.  
 Admiral Miklós Horthy during the period of Kingdom of Hungary (1920–1944)

Iceland
 Hermann Jónasson, Stefán Jóhann Stefánsson, Eysteinn Jónsson, Jakob Ragnar Valdimar Möller, Ólafur Thors during Denmark's occupation between 1940 and 1941.
 Sveinn Björnsson was regent for King Christian X during Denmark's occupation between 1941 and 1944.

Italy
 Prince Umberto, Prince of Piedmont was regent for his father, King Vittorio Emanuele III, between 1944 and 1946 (whom he briefly succeeded as King Umberto II)

Italy

Mantua
 Isabella d'Este (1519–1521), during the minority of her son Federico II.

Parma
 Margherita de' Medici (1646–1648), during the minority of her son Ranuccio II
 Dorothea Sophie of Neuburg (1731) during the absence of her grandson Charles I
 Louise d'Artois (1854–1859), during the minority of her son Robert I.

Savoy
 Christine Marie of France (1637–1663), during the minority of her son Charles Emmanuel II.
 Marie Jeanne of Savoy (1675–1680), during the minority of her son Victor Amadeus II.

Portugal
 Countess Teresa, during the minority of her son Afonso I (1112–1139). Styled herself Queen of Portugal.
 Afonso, Count jure uxoris of Boulogne-sur-Mer, after Pope Innocent IV had deposed his brother Sancho II, and before assuming himself the throne as Afonso III, following Sancho's death (1245–1248). Styled himself Regent and Defender of the Kingdom.
 Queen Leonor, for her daughter Beatrice I (1383).
 João, Mestre de Avis, during the Dynastic Crisis, and before assuming himself the throne as John I (1384–1385). Styled himself Regent and Defender of the Kingdom.
 Queen Eleanor, during the minority of her son Afonso V (1438–1439).
 Peter, Duke of Coimbra, during the minority of his nephew Afonso V (1439–1448).
 Queen Catharine, during the minority of her grandson Sebastian I (1557–1562).
 Cardinal Prince Henry, during the minority of his grandnephew Sebastian I (1562–1568).
 Queen Luísa, for her son Afonso VI (1656–1662).
 Prince Peter, for his brother Afonso VI, and before assuming himself the throne as Peter II, following Afonso's death (1668–1683).
 Catherine, Queen Dowager of England, Scotland and Ireland, for her brother, Peter II, in 1701 and 1704–05. 
 John, Prince Regent, during the incapacity of his mother Mary I, and before assuming himself the throne as John VI, following her death (1792–1816).
 Princess Isabel Maria, following her father's (John VI) death, and whilst awaiting the arrival of her brother Peter IV to assume the throne (1826–1828).
 Prince Michael, for his niece Mary II, and before usurping the throne for himself as Michael I (1828).
 Peter, Duke of Bragança (former King Peter IV), for his daughter Mary II (1831–1834).
 King jure uxoris Ferdinand II, during the minority of his son Peter V (1853–1855).

Romania
 Lascăr Catargiu, Gen. Nicolae Golescu, Col. Nicolae Haralambie (1866), between the overthrow of Alexandru Ioan Cuza and the coronation of Carol I as Prince.
 Prince Nicholas, Miron Cristea, Gheorghe Buzdugan (replaced upon his death by Constantin Sărăţeanu) (1927–1930), during the minority of king Michael I.

Russia
 Saint Olga for her son Svyatoslav (945–969)
 Sophia of Lithuania for her son Vasily II (1425–1432)
 Elena Glinskaya for her son Ivan the Terrible (1533–1538) with her favorite Ivan Fedorovich (d. 1539)
 Sophia Alekseyevna for her brothers Ivan V and Peter the Great (1682–1689)
 Natalia Naryshkina for her son Peter the Great (1689–1694)
 Ernst Johann von Biron for the infant Ivan VI (1740)
 Anna Leopoldovna for her son Ivan VI (1740–1741)

Serbia

 Princess Milica, Regent of Serbia during the minority of Stefan Lazarević (1389)
 Council of Regency during the Serbian Despotate: Mihailo Anđelović, Stefan Branković, and Helena Palaiologina (fl. 1458)
 Council of Regency during the minority of Prince Milan: Milivoje Petrović Blaznavac, Jovan Ristić and Jovan Gavrilović (1868–1872)
 Council of Regency during the minority of King Aleksandar Obrenović V: Jovan Ristić, Kosta Protić (d. 1892) and Jovan Belimarković (1889–1893)
 Crown Prince Alexander, Regent of the Kingdom of Serbia (1914–1918) and Regent of the Kingdom of Serbs, Croats and Slovenes (1918–1921), until the death of his father King Peter I

Serbian regents abroad
 Helena and Beloš Vukanović, Co-Regents of Hungary (1141–1146)

Yugoslavia
 Crown Prince Alexander, Regent of the Kingdom of Serbia (1914–1918) and Regent of the Kingdom of Serbs, Croats and Slovenes (1918–1921), until the death of his father King Peter I
 Council of Regency during the minority of King Peter II: Prince Paul, Radenko Stanković, Ivo Perović (1934–1941)

Oceania

Hawaii

 Queen Kaahumanu, between 1824 and 1832 during the rule of the infant Kamehameha III; she was also Kuhina Nui (co-ruler), regent, of Kamehameha II
 Elizabeth Kīnau, between 5 June 1832 – 17 March 1833 after Kaahumanu's death and before Kamehameha III became 20 years old

Notes